Hidenobu (written: 秀信 or 英暢) is a masculine Japanese given name. Notable people with the name include:

, Japanese voice actor
, Japanese samurai
, Japanese politician
, Japanese footballer

Japanese masculine given names